Chiropsellidae is a family of venomous box jellyfish within the class Cubozoa.

Genera

 Chiropsella Gershwin, 2006
 Chiropsella bart Gershwin & Alderslade, 2007
 Chiropsella bronzie Gershwin, 2006
 Chiropsella rudloei Bentlage, 2013
 Chiropsella saxoni Gershwin & Ekins, 2015
 Meteorona Toshino, Miyake & Shibata, 2015
 Meteorona kishinouyei Toshino, Miyake & Shibata, 2015

References

 
Chirodropida
Cnidarian families